St. Mother Theresa Engineering College (SMTEC), Vagaikulam in Tuticorin, Tamil Nadu, India is a self-financing engineering college run by the SCAD(Social Change And Development) group of institutions. The institution is approved by AICTE and affiliated with Anna University, Chennai. The college was established in 2009 with innovative effort for providing technical education to rural people of Tuticorin district by Dr.S.Cletus Babu and Dr.J.X Amali Cletus Babu. SMTEC started its function with 157 students and 47 staffs offering five Engineering Degree courses B.E in Mechanical Engineering, B.E in  Electronics and Communication Engineering, B.E in Electrical and Electronics Engineering and B.E in Civil Engineering. In the year of 2011 B.E in Computer Science and Engineering is also added to MTEC with a change of intake(120 students/Branch) to the department of Electronics and Communication Engineering, Mechanical Engineering and Civil Engineering. The intake for Aeronautical Engineering has been stopped from June 2016 onwards. The college is located at the center of Tirunelveli-Thoothukudi National Highway(NH 7A). The notable landmarks are the Tuticorin Airport and Capsi restaurant. SMTEC ranks first among its sister institutions Francis Xavier Engineering College, SCAD Engineering College and 105 rank among the 516 self-financing institutions under the Anna University in terms of university examination results November–December 2015.Also there are a notable number of Malayali students in every departments pursuing their degree at SMTEC.

SCAD

SCAD(Social Change And Development) was founded in 1985 by Dr.S.Cletus Babu working with 5 villages in Cheranmahadevi. The main objective of SCAD Group of institutions is to promote educational institutions for the overall benefit of the country in general and the state in particular.

Infrastructure

The college has a digital library, canteen, play field, auditorium, separated hostels for boys and girls and well equipped laboratories.

MTEC offers Undergraduate courses in five disciplines.

Undergraduate programmes
 B.E in Computer Science and Engineering
 B.E in Electronics and Communication Engineering
 B.E in Electrical and Electronics Engineering
 B.E in Mechanical Engineering
 B.E in Civil Engineering

Departments

With a total strength of 1207 students and 117 staffs. MTEC has totally seven Departments including

 Department of Computer Science and Engineering
 Department of Electronics and Communication Engineering
 Department of Electrical and Electronics Engineering
 Department of Mechanical Engineering
 Department of Civil Engineering
 Department of Science and Humanities

Student life

Academic dress for students is formal outfit: formal shirts and pants for boys and chudidhar and salwar for girls. College day is celebrated on the even semester, most likely on March of every year. It is one of the most renowned and grand cultural festivals, consisting of dance, mime etc. Also students are enhanced in knowledge through industrial visit to their core related companies in Southern India in the odd semester accompanied by a Tour of the State. Other than that, a National Level Technical Symposium is organized by every department in the academic odd semester of each year. In addition the regional festivals such as Pongal, Onam are celebrated. Graduation/Convocation day is on February for the passed out set in each year.

References

External links
 

Engineering colleges in Tamil Nadu
Education in Thoothukudi